Brahmanbaria-3 is a constituency represented in the Jatiya Sangsad (National Parliament) of Bangladesh since 2011 by Obaidul Muktadir Chowdhury of the Awami League.

Boundaries 
The constituency encompasses Bijoynagar and Brahmanbaria Sadar upazilas.

History 
The constituency was created in 1984 from the Comilla-3 constituency when the former Comilla District was split into three districts: Brahmanbaria, Comilla, and Chandpur.

Ahead of the 2008 general election, the Election Commission redrew constituency boundaries to reflect population changes revealed by the 2001 Bangladesh census. The 2008 redistricting altered the boundaries of the constituency.

Ahead of the 2014 general election, the Election Commission expanded the boundaries of the constituency to include all of the former Brahmanbaria Sadar (which in 2010 had been split into a smaller Brahmanbaria Sadar Upazila and the new Bijoynagar Upazila). Previously the constituency had excluded six union parishads: Budhal, Budhanti, Chandura, Harashpur, Majlishpur, and Purba Talsahar.

Members of Parliament

Elections

Elections in the 2010s 

Lutful Hai Sachchu died in November 2010. Obaidul Muktadir Chowdhury of the Awami League was elected in a January 2011 by-election, defeating BNP candidate Khaled Mahbub.'''

Elections in the 2000s

Elections in the 1990s

References

External links
 

Parliamentary constituencies in Bangladesh
Brahmanbaria District